Amblycheila baroni, also known as the montane giant tiger beetle, is a species of tiger beetle in the genus Amblycheila.

References

Cicindelidae
Beetles of North America
Beetles described in 1890